The Xitun Formation is a palaeontological formation which is named after Xitun village in Qujing, a location in South China. This formation includes many remains of fossilized fish and plants of the Early Devonian period (Late Lochkovian). It was originally referred to as the Xitun Member of the Cuifengshan Formation (now the Cuifengshan Group).

Fossil content

Vertebrates

Acanthodians

Actinopterygians

Chondrichthyes

Jawless fish

Placoderms

Sarcopterygians

Plants

See also 
 List of fossil sites—  (with link directory)

References 

Geologic formations of China
Devonian System of Asia
Devonian China
Devonian northern paleotropical deposits
Paleontology in China